Walter Bayly Llona (born 9 April 1956) is a Peruvian economist and financier, currently serving as the Chief Executive Officer of Credicorp. He previously served as CEO of Banco de Crédito del Perú, the largest bank in Peru. He is a member of the board of the Institute of International Finance.

Early life and education
Bayly Llona was born in Lima, Peru on 9 April 1956, to James Francis Bayly Gallagher y Lucía Llona Astete. His grandmother was Peruvian writer Mercedes Gallagher Ortiz de Villate and his nephew is Emmy Award-winning television personality and author Jaime Bayly.

He received his bachelor's in business administration from the Universidad del Pacifico and his MBA from Hult International Business School (then known as the Arthur D. Little School of Management).

Career
Bayly started working at Banco de Crédito del Perú in 1993. He became CEO of the bank in 2008.

In 2017, Bayly became a member of the board of directors of the Institute of International Finance.

In 2018, Bayly became CEO of Credicorp.

Additional affiliations and memberships 
Bayly also serves on the board of Institute of International Finance and Banco de la Microempresa.

Personal life
Bayly Llona is married to Fátima Aramburú Álvarez-Calderón.

References

Peruvian businesspeople
Hult International Business School alumni
Living people
1956 births